The International Medical Admissions Test (IMAT), is an aptitude test used as part of the admissions process for some Italian universities. These universities offer undergraduate courses that are taught in English and open to applicants outside of Italy. The test has sometimes been incorrectly referred to as the 'Italian Medical Admissions Test'.

The test is conducted by Italian Ministry of Education, Universities and Research (MIUR) in conjunction with Cambridge Assessment Admissions Testing, which also conducts admission tests for universities in the UK.

Participants
The following universities offer a number of places for both home and overseas students to study medicine as part of this initiative. There is a separate ranking between EU and non-EU candidates, therefore the minimum scores to enter each university differ between the two as well. 
 University of Bari (42 EU spaces, 8 non-EU spaces)
 University of Bologna (75 EU spaces, 15 non-EU spaces)
 University of Campania 'Luigi Vanvitelli' (40 EU spaces, 40 non-EU spaces)
University of Messina (30 EU spaces, 20 non-EU spaces)
International Medical School at the University of Milan (34 EU spaces, 16 non-EU spaces)
 University of Milan-Bicocca (22 EU spaces, 13 non-EU spaces)
University of Padua (54 EU spaces, 9 non-EU spaces)
 University of Pavia (70 EU spaces, 40 non-EU spaces)
 University of Parma (60 EU spaces, 40 non-EU spaces)
Sapienza University of Rome (38 EU spaces, 10 non-EU spaces)
 University of Rome Tor Vergata (25 EU spaces, 10 non-EU spaces)
 University of Siena (26 EU spaces, 12 non-EU spaces)
University of Turin (70 EU spaces, 31 non-EU spaces)
University of Naples Federico II (15 EU spaces, 10 non-EU spaces)

Applicants for the existing courses taught in Italian currently take an Italian admissions test (developed by the Italian Commission), with the available places awarded to those scoring highest on the test. In 2011, MIUR asked Cambridge Assessment Admissions Testing to develop and deliver the English language equivalent of this Italian admissions test. The English-language version is called the International Medical Admissions Test (IMAT).

Humanitas University in Italy also uses IMAT for its Medicine and Surgery degree course. Pirogov Russian National Research Medical University (RNRMU) uses the test for admission to its bachelor's degree in Biomedicine (English taught, with the University of Turin) and Medicine and Surgery degree (English taught, with the University of Milan).

The candidates can sit for the IMAT either in Italy or in test centers located in over 20 countries worldwide. In order to apply for a spot in the medicine course, the candidates must rank the universities in order of preference. The candidates who choose Italy as their test center must sit for the IMAT at their first-choice university. Disabled candidates and candidates with dyslexia are allowed extra time to complete the test.

Format and timing
Recently the format of the test has consisted of the following four sections:
Section 1:  Logical Reasoning and General Knowledge. This section tests generic skills in problem-solving, understanding argument, data analysis and inference; general knowledge. It is made up of 22 multiple-choice questions.
Section 2, 3 and 4: Scientific Knowledge. These sections test a candidate's ability to apply scientific knowledge from school science. They are made up of 38 multiple-choice questions: Biology (18 questions), Chemistry (12 questions), Physics & Mathematics (8 questions).

Recently candidates have been allowed a total of 100 minutes to complete the test (60 questions). All questions had five options, of which one was correct. A correct answer was awarded 1.5 points, a blank answer 0 points and a wrong answer subtracted 0.4 points from the final score.

The score for each section is calculated separately, then combined and ranked. If two candidates have the same combined score, the one who scores higher in Logical Reasoning and General Knowledge will be ranked higher. If the score in Section Logical Reasoning and General Knowledge is also the same, then the ranking is based on the one who scores higher in Biology, followed by Chemistry, Mathematics and Physics. If the scores for each section are the same, then the candidate who has an English Language certification (IELTS, TOEFL) will be ranked higher. If both candidates have all the necessary documents, then younger candidate will be ranked higher.

For Italian and EU candidates, there is a minimum cumulative score of 20 points in order to be eligible for entry. For Non-EU citizens, the minimum cumulative score for entry is more than 0.

The format of the test is confirmed when the Italian Ministry of Education, Universities and Research (MIUR) publish the IMAT decree.

IMAT takes place usually in September. The enrollment is normally opened in June or July for about 2 to 3 weeks.

The IMAT test date and registration process for Humanitas University and Russian National Research Medical University are different from the main IMAT session and candidates should visit the respective university websites for more information.

In 2019, there were 10,450 candidates competing for 500 available seats in Medicine in English in all of Italy.

References

External links 
 IMAT website - Cambridge Assessment Admissions Testing 
 UniversItaly website - IMAT online registration
 - IMAT Past Papers (2011-2019)

Entrance examinations
University of Cambridge examinations